The 1971 Pacific Southwest Open was a combined men's and women's tennis tournament played on outdoor hard courts at the Los Angeles Tennis Center in Los Angeles, California in the United States and was part of the 1971 Grand Prix tennis circuit. It was the 45th edition of the tournament and ran from September 20 through September 26, 1971. Pancho Gonzales, aged 43, won the men's singles title and $10,000 first prize money.

The women's singles title was divided between Billie Jean King and Rosie Casals. 1971 was the last year this tournament was a combined men's and women's event. That year, a separate Los Angeles based professional women's tournament was inaugurated: The LA Women's Tennis Championships.

Finals

Men's singles
 Pancho Gonzales defeated  Jimmy Connors 2–6, 6–3, 6–3

Women's singles
 Billie Jean King defeated  Rosie Casals 6–6, div.

Men's doubles
 John Alexander /  Phil Dent defeated  Frank Froehling /  Clark Graebner 7–6, 6–4

Women's doubles
 Rosie Casals /  Billie Jean King defeated  Françoise Dürr /  Judy Tegart Dalton 6–2, 5–7, 7–6

References

Los Angeles Open (tennis)
Pacific Southwest Open
Pacific Southwest Open
Pacific Southwest Open
Pacific Southwest Open